The Palazzo Regio (Royal palace), also known as Viceregio (Viceroyal palace), is a historic building in Cagliari, the ancient residence of the representative of the king of Sardinia during the Aragonese, Spanish and Savoy domination and now the seat of the Metropolitan City of Cagliari. It is located in the historical Castello district.

The building had been originally built in the 14th century and became the seat of the viceroy since 1337, at the behest of Peter IV of Aragon. Over the centuries the building underwent several modifications and extensions. Particularly significant were the 18th century restorations; in 1730, at the hands of the Piedmontese engineers de Guibert and de Vincenti it was built the grand staircase leading to the main floor, the rooms of which were restored in 1735 by della Vallea. The west facade, with the main portal in line with the staircase, was arranged by 1769, as evidenced by the inscription on the window bezel door that opens onto the central balcony.

Between 1799 and 1815 the palace was the official residence of the royal family and the court, in exile from Turin occupied by Napoleon.

In 1885 the palace became property of the Province, who established its representative office and oversaw the restoration of the interior, in order to adapt to the new function. In 1893 began the work of decoration on the Council room, by the perugian Domenico Bruschi for the frescoes and dell'Angeletti for the stuccos. The work was completed in 1896.

Gallery

Notes

Bibliography
 Salvatore Naitza. Architettura dal tardo '600 al classicismo purista. Nuoro, Ilisso, 1992. 
 Maria Grazia Scano. Pittura e scultura dell'Ottocento. Nuoro, Ilisso, 1997.

External links
 
 

Buildings and structures in Cagliari
Royal residences in Italy